Znamenskoye is a rural locality (a selo) and the administrative center of Znamensky District of Omsk Oblast, Russia, located on the Irtysh River. Population:

References

Rural localities in Omsk Oblast